Poti Airport is located in Poti, Georgia.  It has been closed since the collapse of the USSR in the 1990s.  The Georgian government had published plans to reconstruct the airport, but those plans have not been carried out.

References

Defunct airports
Airports in Georgia (country)